Tiradores is Spanish for shooters/sharpshooters and can refer to any of the following:

 Tiradores de Ifni - a Spanish colonial army unit in Morocco,
 IPSC Peru - the Peruvian association for practical shooting commonly called the tiradores in Peru,
 Luna Sharpshooters also known as the "Marksmen of Death" (Spanish "Tiradores de la Muerte"), was a unit in the Philippine Revolutionary Army, 
 Light Reaction Regiment is the premier counter-terrorist unit of the Philippine Army and the Special Mission Unit of the Philippines who is also called the "Tiradores de la Muerte".

See also
 Tirailleur, the French equivalent